Publishing Council of the Russian Orthodox Church is one of the departments of the Holy Synod of the Moscow Patriarchate, in its present form was created in 1994. The task of the Council is to coordinate the activities of the Orthodox publishing organizations, providing methodological, legal, organizational, and other assistance as the ecclesiastical and secular publishers.

History
Publications Council at the Most Holy Synod was formed March 21, 1913.

Modern Publishing Council of the Russian Orthodox Church was the successor to the publishing department of the Russian Orthodox Church, established on the basis of the adopted in February 1945, at the meeting of Local Council of the Russian Orthodox Church, "Regulations on the Administration of the ROC" At the department was given responsibility for the production of the "Journal of the Moscow Patriarchate," church calendars, scripture, religious literature, manuals for church and clergy, and other books needed for church life. In 1956, the publishing arm for the first time since 1918 issued in the country of the Bible.

External links
Official website of the Publishing Council

References

Russian Orthodox Church
Christian publishing companies
Book publishing companies based in Moscow